Margaret Bennett (born 27 October 1946) is a Scottish writer, folklorist, ethnologist, broadcaster, and singer. Her main interests lies in the field of traditional Scottish folk culture and cultural identity of the Scots in Scotland and abroad. The late Hamish Henderson, internationally distinguished poet and folklorist, said about her: Margaret embodies the spirit of Scotland.

Biography
Margaret Bennett grew up in a family of tradition bearers: Gaelic, from her mother's side, and Irish and Lowland Scots from her father's. She and her three sisters lived their childhood in the Isle of Skye, "in a household where singing, playing music, dancing and storytelling were a way of life as were traditional crafts." The family moved to the Isle of Lewis in the late 1950s, and then to the Shetland Islands between 1963–1964, when her father (a civil engineer) emigrated to Newfoundland, Canada. When visiting him in 1965, she came across the newly founded Folklore Department at Memorial University of Newfoundland. There, under the direction of Prof. Herbert Halpert, she realised that her cultural heritage "was a subject you could actually study and get a degree in."

After finishing her teacher training in Scotland with distinction, Bennett returned to Newfoundland, where she worked as an elementary school teacher in St. John's between 1967–68. From 1968 she attended the University, intermittently lecturing part-time at St. John's Vocational College, then, in 1975, earned a post-graduate MA from M.U.N. She spent a year in Quebec as folklorist for the Museum of Man (now Canadian Museum of Civilization, across the Ottawa River) before returning to Scotland. Between 1977–1984, she worked as a special education teacher in the Scottish Education Department. From 1984 to 1995, she was lecturer in Scottish Ethnology at the School of Scottish Studies of the University of Edinburgh. Since October 1995 she has been Glasgow Honorary Research Fellow of the University of Glasgow (attached to Glasgow-Strathclyde School of Scottish Studies) and lecturer in folklore at the Royal Conservatoire of Scotland in Glasgow.

She is the mother of the late Martyn Bennett.

Academic life
 1967: Dip Ed (Distinction), Jordanhill College of Education (University of Strathclyde), Glasgow.
 1970: she received a BA(Ed) in Education from the Memorial University of Newfoundland at St. John's.
 1975: she earned a post-graduate MA in Folklore from M.U.N. defending her thesis "Some Aspects of the Scottish Gaelic Traditions of the Codroy Valley, Newfoundland", where she records and analyses the traditions of the Gaelic-speaking settlers in the Codroy Valley.
 1994: she achieved a PhD in Ethnology from the University of Edinburgh with a thesis entitled "Hebridean Traditions of the Eastern Townships of Quebec: A Study in Cultural Identity".

Works
 The Last Stronghold: Scottish Gaelic Traditions in Newfoundland (Canada's Atlantic Folklore-folklife series). Canongate Books Ltd, Breakwater Books Ltd, 1989 /  - ,  - 
 Oatmeal and the Catechism: Scottish Gaelic Settlers  in Quebec (Mcgill-Queen's Studies in Ethnic History). McGill Queens University Press, Birlinn, 1999, 2002, 2004.  – ,,  - ,  – , 
 Scottish Customs from the Cradle to the Grave. Polygon, Birlinn Ltd, 1993, 1998, 2004. , .
 Then another thing-Remembered in Perthshire: reminiscences, rhymes, games, songs and stories. (With Doris Rougvie) Perth &  Kinross Council Educations Services, 2000.   - 
 Recollections of an Argyllshire Drover: And Other Selected Papers Eric Cregeen (ed. Margaret Bennett). John Donald Publishers Ltd, 2004.  – 
 ‘See when You look Back…’ Clydeside Reminiscences of the Home Front, 1939–45. The Mitchell Library, 2005. 
 'It's Not the Time You Have...': Notes and Memories of Music-Making with Martyn Bennett. Grace Note Publications, 2006.  -

Discography
 Love and Loss – Remembering Martyn in Scotland's Music, 2007
 Take the road to Aberfeldy, 2007
 Glen Lyon, 2002
 In the sunny long ago…, 2000 (all arrangements and production by Margaret and Martyn Bennett)

Prizes and homages (main)
 Michaelis-Jena Ratcliff Folklore Prize (1991, for her book The Last Stronghold)
 The Scotch Malt Whisky Society Award (1994)
 The Donald Fergusson International Essay Prize (1995) for her study of Gaelic Song in Eastern Canada
 Master Music Maker Award (1998)
 The Clio Award for Quebec, Canadian Historical Association/Société historique du Canada (1999, for her book Oatmeal and the Catechism)
 Exceptional Celtic Woman Award from Celtic Women International, (2003)
 Honorary Life Membership of the Traditional Music and Song Association of Scotland (2007)

References

External links
 Personal page
 Biography at the American Folklife Center
 

1946 births
Living people
Academics of the University of Edinburgh
Memorial University of Newfoundland alumni
People from the Isle of Skye
Scottish folk-song collectors
Scottish folklorists
Women folklorists
Scottish songwriters
20th-century Scottish writers
21st-century Scottish writers
20th-century Scottish women writers
Folklorists of Canadian folklore
Celtic studies scholars
Scottish women academics
21st-century Scottish women writers